Bryan Gerard Alton (5 June 1919 – 18 January 1991) was an Irish physician and member of Seanad Éireann from 1965 to 1973.

He was the personal doctor of Éamon de Valera. His uncle Ernest Alton, was also a Senator.

He was elected to the 11th Seanad in 1965 for the National University constituency. He was re-elected to the Seanad in 1969. He did not contest the 1973 Seanad election.

References

1919 births
1991 deaths
Éamon de Valera
Independent members of Seanad Éireann
20th-century Irish medical doctors
Members of the 11th Seanad
Members of the 12th Seanad
Members of Seanad Éireann for the National University of Ireland
Presidents of the Royal College of Physicians of Ireland